Fermín Gerardo Alvarado Arroyo (born 7 July 1963) is a Mexican politician from the Institutional Revolutionary Party. From 2009 to 2012 he served as Deputy of the LXI Legislature of the Mexican Congress representing Guerrero.

References

1963 births
Living people
Politicians from Guerrero
People from Acapulco
Institutional Revolutionary Party politicians
21st-century Mexican politicians
Autonomous University of Guerrero alumni
Members of the Congress of Guerrero
Deputies of the LXI Legislature of Mexico
Members of the Chamber of Deputies (Mexico) for Guerrero